The Bates Bobcats are the athletic teams of Bates College largely based in Lewiston, Maine and the surrounding areas. The college's official mascot has been the bobcat since 1924, and maintains garnet as its official color. The school sponsors 32 varsity sports (16 men's, 16 women's), most of which compete in the Division III New England Small College Athletic Conference (NESCAC). The school's men's and women's ski teams and men's and women's squash teams compete in Division I. Bates has rivalries with Princeton in Squash and Dartmouth in Skiing and selected hockey bouts. The college also competes with its Maine rivals Bowdoin and Colby in the Colby-Bates-Bowdoin Consortium (CBB). This is one of the oldest football rivalries in the United States. This consortium is a series of historically highly competitive football games ending in the championship game between the three schools. Bates has won this championship at total of twelve times including 2014, 2015, and in 2016 beat Bowdoin 24–7 after their 21–19 abroad victory over Colby. Bates is currently the holder of the winning streak, and has the record for biggest victory in the athletic conference with a 51-0 shutout of Colby College. The three colleges also contest the Colby-Bates-Bowdoin Chase Regatta. The college is the all-time leader of the Chase Regatta with a total of 14 composite wins, followed by Colby's 5 wins, concluded with Bowdoin's 2 wins.

Bates maintains 31 varsity teams, and 9 club teams, including sailing, cycling, ice hockey, rugby, and water polo. According to U.S. Rowing, the Women's Rowing Team is ranked first in the NESCAC, and first overall in NCAA Division III Rowing, as of 2016. In April 2005, the college's athletic program was ranked in the top 5% of national athletics programs. As of 2018, the college has graduated a total of 12 Olympians, one of whom won the Olympic Gold Medal rowing for Canada. The Bobcats have broken records on the state, regional and national level. In the 2015 season, the women's rowing team was the most decorated rowing team in collegiate racing while also being the first to sweep every major rowing competition in its athletic conference in the history of Division III athletics. The ice hockey team is the first team to win the NESCAC Club Ice Hockey Championships four times in a row. In 2015, the men's rowing team had the fastest ascension in rankings of any sport in its athletic conference and was named the NESCAC Rowing Champion. Bates has the 5th highest NESCAC title hold, and holds the top titles in women's and men's rowing. Bates follows Bowdoin's 30 NESCAC titles with its 16, and its followed by Colby's 9 titles.

Men's sports

Men's football 
The men's football team competes in the Division III New England Small College Athletic Conference (NESCAC). The football team is led by head coach, Matt Coyne.

The Bobcats played Toledo in the 1946 Glass Bowl, losing 21–12.

Men's basketball 

Bates College's men's basketball team is led by head coach Jon Furbush, and in 2015 he led the team to the semi-finals of the NCAA Division III Basketball Championships. He is the youngest head coach in the history of the team and was named the 2014–15 Maine Coach of the Year by the Maine Men's Basketball Coaches and Writers Association.

Men's baseball

Men's golf

Men's lacrosse 
The men's lacrosse team is led by head coach, Peter Lasagna, who has been head for the past 16 seasons. In 2015, Lasagna won his third NESCAC Coach of the Year and has led the Bobcats to five appearances in the NESCAC Championship. In 2015, the team reported 156 points scored, ranking them 6th in-conference, and 5th overall.

Men's rowing 

The Men's Rowing team is headed by Peter Steenstra, who was awarded the 2015 Division III Coach of the Year Award by the College Rowing Coaches Association, after also receiving Men's and Women's Coach of the Year honors from both the New England Small College Athletic Conference (NESCAC) and the Eastern College Athletic Conference (ECAC). Alumni, Andrew Byrnes (class of 2005), won the Olympic Gold Medal while rowing for the Canadian National Team, in 2008 in the Beijing Olympics.

Men's tennis

Men's rugby

Men's nordic skiing

Men's cross country

Men's track & field

Men's squash

Women's sports

Women's rowing 

The Women's Rowing team is headed by Peter Steenstra, who was awarded the 2015 Division III Coach of the Year Award by the College Rowing Coaches Association, after also receiving Men's and Women's Coach of the Year honors from both the New England Small College Athletic Conference (NESCAC) and the Eastern College Athletic Conference (ECAC). The women's rowing team is the first rowing team to sweep every major rowing competition in its athletic conference in the history of Division III athletics, a feat completed in 2015. According to U.S. Rowing, the Women's Rowing Team is ranked 1st in the New England Small College Athletic Conference, and 1st overall in NCAA Division III Rowing, as of 2016.

Women's track & field

Women's squash

Women's soccer

Women's basketball 
The 2004 women's basketball team was ranked first in the United States for most of February 2005 and finished the year ranked number six by the USA Today/ESPN Today 25 National Coaches' Poll. The women's basketball team earned the top seed in the NESCAC in 2005, and competed in the finals with Bowdoin for three consecutive years until 2008.

Women's cross country

Club sports

Volleyball

Ice hockey 
As of 2016, the men's club ice hockey team is ranked #5 in the Northeast, and #25 overall in the NESCHA rankings.

Sailing team 

The college's sailing team is based at the Taylor Pond Yacht Club, in Auburn, Maine. The team sails in the New England Intercollegiate Sailing Association (NEISA) conference with its main competitors being Bowdoin, Tufts, and Massachusetts Institute of Technology, among the other 40+ schools in the conference. The team regularly competes at the largest collegiate keelboat regatta in the Western Hemisphere, the Intercollegiate Offshore Regatta (IOR) held at Larchmont Yacht Club by the Storm Trysail Foundation). The team regularly updates their website and their social media platforms.

Colby-Bates-Bowdoin Consortium

Olympians 

As of 2018, the college has graduated a total of 12 Olympians, one of whom won the Olympic Gold Medal rowing for Canada.

Athletic facilities

References

External links